The azure jay (Cyanocorax caeruleus) (Brazilian Portuguese: Gralha-azul, meaning blue jackdaw) is a passeriform bird of the crow family, Corvidae. It is found in the Atlantic Forest, especially with Araucaria angustifolia, in south-eastern Brazil (São Paulo to Rio Grande do Sul), far eastern Paraguay and far north-eastern Argentina. It is the state bird of Paraná.

Description 
Its plumage is intensely blue with a contrasting black head and upper chest. Males and females are similar, although the females typically are smaller.

Its breeding season is from October to January. This bird is a social breeder. It lays 2–4 eggs and its nest is made of sticks.

Diet 
It feeds extensively on the nut-like seeds of Araucaria angustifolia, but it is not strictly limited to this since it also feeds on insects and fruit. As other corvids, azure jays are highly intelligent. Their communication is complex, consisting of at least 14 distinct vocalizations. They form groups of 4 to 15 individuals that are well organized in hierarchies. These groups remain stable for up to two generations.

See also
Blue Crow

References

Cyanocorax caeruleus - azure jay specimen(s) in the ZMA

External links
 A lenda da Gralha Azul The legend of the Blue Jay in Portuguese (Internet Archive copy)

azure jay
Birds of the Atlantic Forest
Birds of the South Region
Birds of the Selva Misionera
azure jay
azure jay
Taxobox binomials not recognized by IUCN